Anissa Daoud is a Franco-Tunisian actress, author and producer. Living between Paris and Tunis, she is part of the art collective Artists Producers Associates (APA).

Career 
Anissa Daoud grew up in Tunisia, of Tunisian parents.
Self-taught, her acting career started in cinema with leading roles in She and He by Elyes Baccar, Thalathun by Fadhel Jaziri, The Long Night by Syrian director Hatem Ali or La Tendresse Du Loup by Jilani Saadi, for which she has received many awards. 
At the Theatre, she took part, as an actress and staging assistant, in the productions of director Mohamed Guellati in France, Africa or Palestine (the Freedom Theatre in Jenin) for several years. She also worked under the direction of Franco-Comoran choreographer :fr:Karry Kamal Karry. 
In 2010, she got back to her Italian roots in Naples interpreting, in Italian, the role of Juliet in Romeo and Juliet directed by Alexander Zeldin for the Napoli Teatro Festival. 
Since 2009, Anissa has joined director Lotfi Achour as co-playwright and actress on the musical and theatrical shows Hobb Story, Sex in The Arab City and Macbeth: Leila and Ben has Bloody History, created for the 2012 London Olympics. 
Together they founded the APA : Artists Producers Associated, and through it, she has been producing various shows and movies, some of which were in official competitions at top festivals such as Clermont-Ferrand, Dubai, Cannes or the Venice Film Festival.
More recently she has played the female lead role in Jeunesse Tunsienne- Tunisian Spring by Raja Amari and produced by Arte, winning the Best Actress Award In Durban International Film Festival - South Africa, and in Les Frontières du Ciel by Fares Naanaa for which she has also received the Best Actress award at the Rencontre des Réalisateurs Tunisiens.

In 2016 she is one of main characters, the co-writer and co-producer of the first feature of Lotfi Achour "Demain dès l'Aube".

Filmography

Cinema

Features 
 2004 : Elle et lui d'Elyès Baccar
 2004 : Noce d'été de Mokhtar Ladjimi
 2006 : Tendresse du loup de Jilani Saadi
 2007 : Thalathoun de Fadhel Jaziri
 2009 : Al-Layl al-Taweel (The long night) de Hatem Ali
 2014 : Printemps tunisien de Raja Amari
 2015 : Les Frontières du ciel de Fares Naanaa 
 2016 : Demain dès l'aube de Lotfi Achour

Short movies 
 1999 : Tunis... fille du siècle de Taïeb Jellouli
 2010 : L’Album by Shiraz Fradi 
 2010 : Tiraillement by Najwa Slama Limam
 2014 : Laisse-moi finir by Doria Achour
 2014 : Père by Lotfi Achour
 2016 : Le Reste est l'œuvre de l'homme by Doria Achour

Television 
 2008 : Toi-même tu sais by John Gabriel Biggs
 2008 : Villa Jasmin by Ferid Boughedir

Documentaries 
 2008 : Hé ! N'oublie pas le cumin de Hala Abdalla Yacoub
 2013 : Artistes en Tunisie de Serge Moati
 2014 : 7 vies de Lilia Blaise et Amine Boufaied

Theatre 

 2001Pied de guerre : by Mohamed Guellati
 2001Petite fleur : by Mohamed Guellati
 2003Rahmen : by Elyès Baccar , choréography of Karry Kamal Karry
 2006Y'en a plus bon ! : by Mohamed Guellati
 2006 Vous avez de si jolis moutons, pourquoi vous ne parlez pas des moutons ? : by Mohamed Guellati
 2007 Nakba, en marchant j'ai vu : by Mohamed Guellati and Juliano Mer-Khamis
 2009Hobb Story - Sex in the (Arab) city : by Lotfi Achour (acting and co-writing)
 2010Roméo et Juliette of William Shakespeare : by d'Alexander Zeldin
 2012Leila and Ben - A Bloody History : by Lotfi Achour (acting and co-writing with Lotfi Achour and Jaouhar Basti)
 2014 Je suis encore en vie : by Jacques Allaire

Distinctions and awards 

 Best Actrice Award at the Festival international du film de Durban for her role in Printemps tunisien
 Best Feminine Interpretation Award at the Festival du cinéma africain de Tarifa for her role in Tendresse du loup
 Best Feminine Interpretation Award  at the Festival international du film d’Alexandrie for her role in Tendresse du loup
 Best Feminine Interpretation Award  at the Festival international du film de Mascate for her role in Tendresse du loup
 Best Feminine Interpretation Award  at the Rencontre des réalisateurs tunisiens for her role in Les Frontières du ciel

References

External links 

20th-century Tunisian actresses
Living people
21st-century Tunisian actresses
Tunisian film actresses
Tunisian television actresses
Place of birth missing (living people)
Year of birth missing (living people)